

External links 

Lists of 2016 term United States Supreme Court opinions